Sergei Stanislavovich Yeliseyev (born 24 October 1961) is a Vice Admiral, former First Deputy Commander and acting commander-in-chief of the Ukrainian Navy who defected to Russia in 2014 during Russian annexation of Crimea.

Early career
He graduated from a Soviet naval school in Kaliningrad in 1983 and previously served with the Russian Pacific Fleet of the Soviet Navy.

Career with Ukraine
In 1993, Yeliseyev joined the newly formed Ukrainian Navy and in 1999–2001 he was a commander of Ropucha-class landing ship U402 Kostyantyn Olshanskyi.

In 2004, he graduated from the National Defense Academy of Ukraine.

In 2010, he was appointed the First Deputy Commander of the Ukrainian Navy and later on promoted to Vice-admiral.

Defection to Russia
From 19 February to 1 March 2014, Yeliseyev was acting Commander of the Ukrainian Navy as the First Deputy Commander. In March 2014, he broke the military oath of the Ukrainian Armed Forces and sided with the Russian Federation against Ukraine along with another high-ranking military officer, the appointed commander-in-chief of the Ukrainian Navy Denis Berezovsky in the wake of the Crimean Crisis. 

In August 2014, the Military Prosecutor's Office of Ukraine accused Eliseev of treason and desertion.

Career with Russian Navy
Since July 2014, he has served as a Deputy Commander of the Russian Baltic Fleet and retained his rank of Vice-admiral in the Russian Navy.

Eliseev was the only senior officer in the command of the Baltic Fleet who retained his post after the dismissal of the then Baltic fleet commander Vice-admiral  in June 2016 and the subsequent removal of more officers from the headquarters of the fleet for failure to comply to rules and regulations.

See also
 Denis Berezovsky

References

1961 births
Living people
People from Noginsk
Russian sailors
Fugitives wanted by Ukraine
Ukrainian admirals
Ukrainian defectors
Naval commanders of Ukraine
People of the annexation of Crimea by the Russian Federation
Russian admirals
Pro-Russian people of the 2014 pro-Russian unrest in Ukraine
Recipients of the Order of Bohdan Khmelnytsky, 2nd class
Recipients of the Order of Bohdan Khmelnytsky, 3rd class